Filatima pallipalpella is a moth of the family Gelechiidae. It is found in the Russian Far East.

The wingspan is 16–17 mm. The forewings are dark brownish-grey with a rust-yellow ringed dot at the fold. Above this, at two-fifths an ill-defined double rust-yellow cross-line with a similar line on the vein. The hindwings are dark grey.

References

Moths described in 1884
Filatima